Brezje pri Dobu is a settlement in the Municipality of Domžale in the Upper Carniola region of Slovenia.

Name
Brezje pri Dobu was attested in written sources as Pirch in 1287.
The name of the settlement was changed from Brezje to Brezje pri Dobu in 1953. In the past, the German name was Bresje.

References

External links 

Brezje pri Dobu on Geopedia

Populated places in the Municipality of Domžale